Forever is the fifth studio album by Filipino singer-actress Jolina Magdangal released by GMA Records in January 2004.

Track listing

Personnel 
Adapted from the Forever Jolina liner notes.

 Buddy Medina – executive producer
 Kedy Sanchez – producer, vocal arranger
 Gerdie Francisco & Mike Jamir – producer for the track "Narito (Ang Puso Ko)"
 Nikki Cunanan – recording engineer
 Jeffrey Felix – recording engineer
 Don Manalang – recording engineer
 Ramil Bahadi – recording engineer
 Agatha Obar – vocal supervision
 Melvin Morallos – vocal arranger
 Ida Ramos-Henares – album design
 Joni & Geraldine Raso – digital imaging
 Jason Tablante – photography
 Nemi Rafanan – hair & make-up
 Mervin Lazaro – wardrobe

Awards
Gold Record Award; Favorite Female Artist (2004 MTV Pilipinas Awards)

See also
GMA Records
GMA Network

References

2004 albums
Jolina Magdangal albums
GMA Music albums